Nikola Hristov (Bulgarian: Никола Христов; born 28 May 1951) is a former Bulgarian footballer who played as a forward from 1969 to 1982, notably for Dunav Ruse, where he made over 240 league appearances for the club and scored over 110 goals.

He also played for CSKA Sofia and Botev Vratsa, as well as for the Bulgarian national team. Hristov made his Bulgaria debut in 1973 and went on to win 7 caps for the national side.

Honours 
CSKA Sofia
Bulgarian League: 1979–80

References

External links

1951 births
Living people
Bulgarian footballers
Bulgaria international footballers
Association football forwards
FC Dunav Ruse players
PFC CSKA Sofia players
FC Botev Vratsa players
First Professional Football League (Bulgaria) players
Bulgarian football managers